Parom is a Tehsil in Panjgur District in Balochistan, Pakistan. The historical area of Parom was divided by the Goldsmith line, thus a small part of it falls in Iranian territory. According to local legend, it was also known as Gulshan, meaning 'rose garden'. The word  means 'growth' in the Balochi language and is attributed to Parom due to its mild climate and the fertile soil which supports more than one crop per year.  Today the region has two union councils, Parom and Koh Bun.  The population numbers around 50,000 people.

Paroom has very pleasant summer months and it is noted for its mild summers in contrast to the hot summers in other parts of the Makran division. Most of Parom's inhabitants depend on farming, the main crop being Muzati dates. The people's main income comes from farming and border business.
The historical villages in Paroom are Diz (meaning 'fort': the main fort of Parom was once situated here), Dasht Shahbaz, Jayeen, Legoork, Sengozai Bazar, Gwash and Sham-e-sar, Kaleri and Reesh Peesh. There were two archaeological sites called dambs which resembled neolithic sites but were bulldozed in 2008 to use the area for farming. There are several other small dambs dotting along the Dambani Kaur. The Dambani Kaur is a dry river which used to fill the Parom-e- Kup (Lake Parom) when it rains.

History
There are no written historical records available. Recent historical records show Parom as an independent area ruled by the ruling Shambezai family of Diz fort in alliance with the ruling family of Sanjarzai, who had their fort in upper Parom. Prior to the British rule, these two tribes were also in alliance with the ruling Durrazai family of Dizzak. Dizzak now falls under Iranian territory.

Historical ballads from the area depict Parom as a fertile land where outside forces often invaded to rob grain, live stock and other wealth. The people of Parom, like their neighbours of Zamuran, take pride in defending independence under the rule of the main fort from various invaders like the Gichkis, Nousherwanis and the Damunis. Parom had a strategical advantage as almost all trade routes originating from Afghanistan, Noshki, Kharan, Panjgur and going towards the costal ports of either Gwadar, Jiwani, or Chahbar had to pass from here. The revenue collected by the Diz fort was instrumental in helping it defend its independence.  One such ballad conveys that one of the rulers, Khoda Murad Shambezai, set an example of bravery and valor. He, along with his friend Dost Mohammed, chose to confront the invading Damani tribes from Sistan after the invaders succeeded in robbing a trade caravan which had not managed to fortify themselves in Diz fort before the invasion. Again when the Nosharwanis attacked Paroom during the last decade of the seventeenth century to turn it into a subordinate, Khoda Kamaaln Shambezai defended the territory and the Sardar of Nosharwani. Sardar Abdullah was killed at an ensuing battle in Sorcheel. Khoda Kamalan's rule faded gradually with the arrival of the British as the ruling family of Parom did not offer any resistance and tried to maintained some sovereignty by negotiation. The British in their gazetteer recorded that Khoda Kamalan was, in 1905, trying to improve the area's water resources, probably to facilitate the trade caravans and for irrigation of farmlands. 

Recent history

After the occupation of Balochistan, Parom came under the governance of Pakistan. The people of Parom lived peaceful lives until 2004; with renewed political awareness and a new insurgency in Makran, the people of Parom now show their dissatisfaction with the way Pakistan has ignored the area. They are also disappointed with the mainstream political parties of Balochistan which at one time turned Parom into a hotbed of Baloch militant groups. The chief commander of the Baloch Republican Army, Gulzar Imam and Major Noora of Balochistan Liberation Front both belong to the area. Many people were killed as a result of various military operations in Paroom. Some of those killed include Mehrab Omar, Abid Rasol, Faroq Peer Mohmmad, Nasir Dost, Wahab Hassan, Hussan Shahsawar, Kazzapi Ahmad, Omar Gani, and recently Major Noora of BLF with his three other comrades, Lieutenant Nawaz Gulab, his brother A. Malik, and Basham Jan.

Tribes
There are several different tribes and clans in Parom. Some of these tribes or Zai  
 Barh (also present in Paroom; Buleda; Dasht; Pishin, Iran; and other parts of Balochistan)
 Shambezai (also present in Turbat, Zamuran, Iran, Bulaida and other parts of Balochistan)
 Sanjarzai, now known as Sanjarani (also present in many areas of Balochistan, Panjab, Sindh, and Afghanistan)
 Raisi (also present in Turbat, Bulaida, Zamuran and Iran)
 Moradzai (also present in district Panjgur and district Kech, (Dasht) Buleda, Kharan, Mashkel and Iran.  In Iran they are known as Meer Muradzai and reside in different parts of Iran, especially in Sarawan.)
 Gorrgenadi
 Qaisarzai
 Askani
 Singozai
 Shahdadzai
 Suhr
 Shehol

Panjgur District